North Shore Hebrew Academy (NSHA or NSHAHS) is a Modern Orthodox yeshiva located in Great Neck, New York. The Academy has four divisions: Pre-K, Elementary (Grades K-5), Middle School (Grades 6-8) and High School (Grades 9-12).

The founding principal of North Shore Hebrew Academy was Rabbi Dr. Ephraim Wolf.

North Shore Hebrew Academy grades Pre-K through 5th grade is located at 16 Cherry Lane in Great Neck, NY. It has a total student population of about 400 students.

North Shore Hebrew Academy Middle School (Grades 6-8) is located at 26 Old Mill Road in Great Neck, NY 11024, sharing a campus with the Great Neck Synagogue. It has a total student population of approximately 170 students.

North Shore Hebrew Academy High School (Grades 9-12) is located at 400 North Service Road, Great Neck, NY 11020. The total student population is approximately 400 students. The high school was founded in 2001; a new  facility was opened in 2006. The school has been accredited by the Middle States Association. The school was rocked by a cheating scandal in 2011, as were some other schools on Long Island; local youth were paid to take SAT and ACT tests for students. In 2016, Niche.com listed it as one of the 100 best private schools in New York.

The high school and middle school athletic teams are called the Lions.

Ivan Kaufman is the Chairman of the Board and Daniella Muller is the President. Kaufman was the primary initiator of the effort to add a high school, which opened in September 2000.

References

External links
 North Shore Hebrew Academy
 North Shore Hebrew Academy High School

Schools in Nassau County, New York
Private high schools in New York (state)
Private middle schools in New York (state)
Private elementary schools in New York (state)
Educational institutions established in 1954
1954 establishments in New York (state)
Jews and Judaism in Nassau County, New York